Khirbat Zalafa was a small Palestinian Arab village in the Tulkarm Subdistrict, located about  northwest of Tulkarm. It was depopulated during the 1948 Palestine war. It was occupied by Yishuv forces on April 15, 1948 as a part of operation "Coastal Clearing."

History
Remains from a settlement dating to  the  Roman-Byzantine era have been found here.

In the modern era, the people of Khirbat Zalafa came from Attil to farm the village land. Gradually they settled in the village so they could be closer to their land. In the late 19th century, Khirbat Zalafa was described as a small hamlet with springs to the south.

British Mandate era
In the 1922 census of Palestine there were 63 villagers, all Muslim.  At the time of the 1931 census, the village was counted under Attil, together with Jalama and Al-Manshiyya.

The village had a small core of houses, with many dwellings scattered throughout on the agricultural lands. The agriculture was based on watermelons, vegetables, grain and olives.

By the 1944/45 statistics  the village had 210 Muslims, while jurisdiction was 7,713 dunams, of which 6,865 was Arab owned, 617 was Jewish owned, while 231 was publicly owned.  Of this, 6,798 dunums were allotted to cereals,  38 dunum was devoted to citrus and bananas ad 6 dunums were irrigated or used for orchards. while 3 dunams were classified as built-up, urban land.

1948 and after
The Palestinian historian Walid Khalidi described the village in 1992: "The village has been completely levelled. Both the original site and the surrounding lands are covered with Israeli citrus orchards."

There are no Israeli settlements on village land.

See also
 Depopulated Palestinian locations in Israel

References

Bibliography

 
 
 

 (p. 245 #635 on p.  298 and The migratory movement..., pp. 21, 23)

External links and references
Welcome To Zalafa, Khirbat
Khirbat Zalafa,  Zochrot
Survey of Western Palestine, Map 11:   IAA, Wikimedia commons
Zalafa, Khirbat, from the Khalil Sakakini Cultural Center

Arab villages depopulated prior to the 1948 Arab–Israeli War
District of Tulkarm